Cattitude may refer to:

 A song from the stage production of Garfield
 A song on the Miley Cyrus album She Is Coming